Puran Bhagat (later became Sri Chauranginatha) was a Punjabi Nath Saint and prince of Sialkot. As per unauthenticated history, he had been exiled and lived the last days of his life in a village located in the suburbs of Sialkot city. His temple and water well is still open for visitors and devotees.

Background
Puran was born to Queen Ichhira, the first wife of king Raja Sálbán. Upon the suggestion of the astrologers, Puran was sent away from the King for the first 12 years of his life. It was said that King could not see the face of his son. While Puran was away, the King married a young girl named Luna,  who came from a low caste family. After 12 years of isolation, Puran returned to the royal palace. There, Luna became romantically attracted toward Puran, who was of the same age. Being the step-son of Luna, Puran disapproved of her advances. A hurt Luna accused Puran of violating her honor.

Puran was ordered to be amputated and killed. The soldiers cutoff his hands and legs and threw him in a well in the forest. One day Guru Gorakhnath were passing by with his followers and heard voice from the well. He took him out using a single thread and unbaked earthen pot. He was later adopted by Baba Gorkhnath. Puran himself became a yogi.

Worship

Puran also known as Baba Sahaj Nath Ji, is the supreme head of the Jandiyals, a Hindu caste. The Jandiyals gather twice a year on Guru Purnima and worship Puran Bhagat. The temple of Bawa Sahaj Nath Ji is located in Pakistan, but after partition, the Jandiyals constructed a temple in Jandi near Heeranagar, Jammu, and in Talab tillo (Jammu), another temple is in Taragarh near Dinanagar where Sharma's including Khajuria's gather twice year and a fourth one is in Dorangla.

Jandiyal families who came from Pakistan bought that temple's sand and used it to construct a small temple in Taragarh. People from all over India come here on Guru Purnima for Darshan.

In addition to the Targarh temple, Jandiyals (Mahajan) have built temples at Agra, Jammu, and Udhampur (J&K). Udhampur city is also known as Devika Nagri. The temple is located at Bypass Road, Fangyal. Jandiyal biradari celebrates and worships Baba Sehaj Nath ji twice a year on Budh Purnima and Kartik Purnima.

In popular culture 

A number of Indian films have been made on the legend of Puran Bhagat. These include: Puran Bhagat (1928) by Pesi Karani, Puran Bhagat (1933) by Debaki Bose, Bhakta Puran (1949) by Chaturbhuj Doshi, Bhakta Puran (1952) by Dhirubhai Desai.

Loona (1965), is an epic verse play based on the legend of Puran Bhagat by Shiv Kumar Batalvi, now considered a masterpiece in modern Punjabi literature, and which also created a new genre, of modern Punjabi kissa. Though Loona is portrayed as a villain in the legend, Batalvi created the epic around her agony which caused her to become a villain. Batalvi became the youngest recipient of the Sahitya Akademi Award in 1967 for Loona.

See Also
Puran's Well
Natha

References

Punjabi folklore
Indian folklore
Legendary Indian people
Indian legends